The 2020 Seattle Sounders FC season was the club's twelfth season in Major League Soccer, the top tier of professional club soccer in the United States. The team was under the management of Brian Schmetzer in his fourth full MLS season as head coach of the Sounders. Seattle were the reigning MLS Cup champions, having defeated Toronto FC 3–1 in the 2019 final at their home stadium, CenturyLink Field.

The season was suspended on March 12, 2020, due to the emerging COVID-19 pandemic; the Sounders had played two home matches—the latter at reduced attendance. MLS resumed with a special tournament in July hosted in the Orlando metropolitan area, while teams returned home a month later to play in behind closed doors matches. The Sounders only played 22 regular season matches due to a shortened schedule and several cancelled matches. The 2020 Campeones Cup was cancelled along with the 2020 U.S. Open Cup.

Seattle qualified for the 2020 MLS Cup Playoffs as the second-placed team in the Western Conference, determined by points per game due to the unbalanced number of games played by MLS teams during the season. The Sounders defeated Los Angeles FC, FC Dallas, and Minnesota United FC at home to earn a second consecutive conference championship and qualify for MLS Cup 2020, where they lost 3–0 to Columbus Crew SC.

Background

The Sounders won the MLS Cup at CenturyLink Field by defeating Toronto FC 3–1. The team is set to play in the 2020 CONCACAF Champions League and 2020 Campeones Cup, along with regular MLS and U.S. Open Cup matches.

Recap
Prior to the start of the season, Sounders backup goalkeeper Bryan Meredith was selected by Inter Miami CF in the 2019 MLS Expansion Draft.

Due to the expansion of the league and the resulting unbalanced schedule, the Sounders were scheduled to not play FC Cincinnati, Orlando City SC, and the Philadelphia Union, although this schedule was later disrupted by the COVID-19 pandemic and most teams only played regional opponents for much of the season, resulting in many teams not playing each other at all, or not until meeting in the 2020 MLS Cup Playoffs.

The second home match of the season, on March 7 against the Columbus Crew SC, had an attendance of 33,080—the lowest for an MLS regular season game in Sounders history. The match was played amid a local outbreak of the COVID-19 pandemic that had caused several deaths in the week prior.

On October 27, the Sounders clinched their 12th consecutive appearance in the MLS Cup playoffs, and on December 7, they won their 4th Western Conference Champion trophy.

Current roster

Out on loan

Competitions

Preseason

Major League Soccer

League tables

Western Conference

Overall

Results

MLS Cup Playoffs

CONCACAF Champions League

Round of 16

U.S. Open Cup

Campeones Cup

2020 MLS is Back Tournament

Group Stage (Group B) 

Note: Group Stage matches are part of MLS regular season standings

Knockout stage

Statistics

Appearances and goals

Numbers after plus-sign(+) denote appearances as a substitute.

[TAC] – Defiance player

Top scorers
{| class="wikitable" style="font-size: 95%; text-align: center;"
|-
!width=30|Rank
!width=30|Position
!width=30|Number
!width=175|Name
!width=75|
!width=75|
!width=75|
!width=75|
!width=75|
!width=75|
!width=75|Total
|-
|rowspan="1"|1
|FW
|9
|align="left"| Raúl Ruidíaz
|12
|0
|0
|2
|0
|0
|14
|-
|rowspan="1"|2
|FW
|13
|align="left"| Jordan Morris
|10
|0
|0
|1
|1
|0
|12
|-
|rowspan="1"|3
|MF
|10
|align="left"| Nicolás Lodeiro
|6
|0
|0
|1
|1
|0
|8
|-
|rowspan="1"|4
|MF
|6
|align="left"| João Paulo
|2
|0
|0
|0
|2
|0
|4
|-
|rowspan="3"|5
|MF
|7
|align="left"| Cristian Roldan
|2
|0
|0
|0
|1
|0
|3
|-
|FW
|17
|align="left"| Will Bruin
|1
|1
|0
|1
|0
|0
|3
|-
|DF
|18
|align="left"| Kelvin Leerdam
|3
|0
|0
|0
|0
|0
|3
|-
|rowspan="2"|8
|DF
|28
|align="left"| Yeimar Gómez Andrade
|2
|0
|0
|0
|0
|0
|2
|-
|MF
|33
|align="left"| Joevin Jones
|2
|0
|0
|0
|0
|0
|2
|-
|rowspan="3"|10
|MF
|7
|align="left"| Gustav Svensson
|0
|0
|0
|1
|0
|0
|1
|-
|DF
|27
|align="left"| Shane O'Neill
|0
|0
|0
|1
|0
|0
|1
|-
|FW
|70
|align="left"| Handwalla Bwana
|1
|0
|0
|0
|0
|0
|1
|-

Top assists
{| class="wikitable" style="font-size: 95%; text-align: center;"
|-
!width=30|Rank
!width=30|Position
!width=30|Number
!width=175|Name
!width=75|
!width=75|
!width=75|
!width=75|
!width=75|
!width=75|
!width=75|Total
|-
|rowspan="1"|1
|MF
|10
|align="left"| Nicolás Lodeiro
|9
|0
|0
|3
|0
|0
|12
|-
|rowspan="1"|2
||FW
|13
|align="left"| Jordan Morris
|7
|0
|0
|1
|1
|0
|9
|-
|rowspan="2"|3
|MF
|7
|align="left"| Cristian Roldan
|5
|0
|0
|0
|1
|0
|6
|-
|FW
|9
|align="left"| Raúl Ruidíaz
|4
|0
|0
|2
|0
|0
|6
|-
|rowspan="1"|5
|MF
|6
|align="left"| João Paulo
|4
|0
|0
|0
|1
|0
|5
|-
|rowspan="1"|6
||DF
|33
|align="left"| Joevin Jones
|3
|1
|0
|0
|0
|0
|4
|-
|rowspan="2"|7
||DF
|3
|align="left"| Xavier Arreaga
|2
|1
|0
|0
|0
|0
|3
|-
|DF
|18
|align="left"| Kelvin Leerdam
|3
|0
|0
|0
|0
|0
|3
|-
|rowspan="6"|9
|DF
|5
|align="left"| Nouhou Tolo
|1
|0
|0
|0
|0
|0
|1
|-
|MF
|8
|align="left"| Jordy Delem
|1
|0
|0
|0
|0
|0
|1
|-
|DF
|16
|align="left"| Alex Roldan
|1
|0
|0
|0
|0
|0
|1
|-
|FW
|17
|align="left"| Will Bruin
|1
|0
|0
|0
|0
|0
|1
|-
|DF
|28
|align="left"| Yeimar Gómez Andrade
|1
|0
|0
|0
|0
|0
|1
|-
|MF
|70
|align="left"| Handwalla Bwana
|1
|0
|0
|0
|0
|0
|1
|-

Disciplinary record
{| class="wikitable" style="text-align:center;"
|-
| rowspan="2" !width=15|
| rowspan="2" !width=15|
| rowspan="2" !width=120|Player
| colspan="3"|MLS
| colspan="3"|MLS is Back (knockout)
| colspan="3"|U.S. Open Cup
| colspan="3"|MLS Playoffs
| colspan="3"|Champions League
| colspan="3"|Campeones Cup
| colspan="3"|Total
|-
!width=34; background:#fe9;|
!width=34; background:#fe9;|
!width=34; background:#ff8888;|
!width=34; background:#fe9;|
!width=34; background:#fe9;|
!width=34; background:#ff8888;|
!width=34; background:#fe9;|
!width=34; background:#fe9;|
!width=34; background:#ff8888;|
!width=34; background:#fe9;|
!width=34; background:#fe9;|
!width=34; background:#ff8888;|
!width=34; background:#fe9;|
!width=34; background:#fe9;|
!width=34; background:#ff8888;|
!width=34; background:#fe9;|
!width=34; background:#fe9;|
!width=34; background:#ff8888;|
!width=34; background:#fe9;|
!width=34; background:#fe9;|
!width=34; background:#ff8888;|

|-
|-
|| 2 || |DF ||align=left| Brad Smith || |0|| |0|| |0|| |0|| |0|| |0|| |0|| |0|| |0|| |1|| |0|| |0|| |0|| |0|| |0|||0|| |0|| |0|| |1|| |0|| |0
|-
|-
|| 3 || |DF ||align=left| Xavier Arreaga || |4|| |0|| |0|| |0|| |0|| |0|| |0|| |0|| |0|| |0|| |0|| |0|| |1|| |0|| |0|||0|| |0|| |0|| |5|| |0|| |0
|-
|-
|| 5 || |DF ||align=left| Nouhou || |1|| |0|| |0|| |0|| |0|| |0|| |0|| |0|| |0|| |0|| |0|| |0|| |1|| |0|| |0|||0|| |0|| |0|| |2|| |0|| |0
|-
|-
|| 6 || |MF ||align=left| João Paulo || |5|| |0|| |0|| |0|| |0|| |0|| |0|| |0|| |0|| |2|| |0|| |0|| |0|| |0|| |0|||0|| |0|| |0|| |7|| |0|| |0
|-
|-
|| 7 || |MF ||align=left| Cristian Roldan || |1|| |0|| |0|| |0|| |0|| |0|| |0|| |0|| |0|| |0|| |0|| |0|| |0|| |0|| |0|||0|| |0|| |0|| |1|| |0|| |0
|-
|-
|| 8 || |MF ||align=left| Jordy Delem || |2|| |0|| |0|| |0|| |0|| |0|| |0|| |0|| |0|| |0|| |0|| |0|| |1|| |0|| |0|||0|| |0|| |0|| |3|| |0|| |0
|-
|-
|| 9 || |FW ||align=left| Raúl Ruidíaz || |2|| |0|| |0|| |0|| |0|| |0|| |0|| |0|| |0|| |0|| |0|| |0|| |0|| |0|| |0|||0|| |0|| |0|| |2|| |0|| |0
|-
|-
|| 10 || |MF ||align=left| Nicolás Lodeiro || |2|| |0|| |0|| |0|| |0|| |0|| |0|| |0|| |0|| |0|| |0|| |0|| |0|| |0|| |0|||0|| |0|| |0|| |2|| |0|| |0
|-
|-
|| 13 || |FW ||align=left| Jordan Morris || |1|| |0|| |0|| |0|| |0|| |0|| |0|| |0|| |0|| |0|| |0|| |0|| |0|| |0|| |0|||0|| |0|| |0|| |1|| |0|| |0
|-
|-
|| 16 || |DF ||align=left| Alex Roldan || |1|| |0|| |0|| |0|| |0|| |0|| |0|| |0|| |0|| |1|| |0|| |0|| |0|| |0|| |0|||0|| |0|| |0|| |2|| |0|| |0
|-
|-
|| 17 || |FW ||align=left| Will Bruin || |1|| |0|| |0|| |0|| |0|| |0|| |0|| |0|| |0|| |0|| |0|| |0|| |0|| |0|| |0|||0|| |0|| |0|| |1|| |0|| |0
|-
|-
|| 18 || |DF ||align=left| Kelvin Leerdam || |2|| |0|| |0|| |0|| |0|| |0|| |0|| |0|| |0|| |0|| |0|| |0|| |0|| |0|| |0|||0|| |0|| |0|| |2|| |0|| |0
|-
|-
|| 24 || |GK ||align=left| Stefan Frei || |0|| |0|| |0|| |0|| |0|| |0|| |0|| |0|| |0|| |0|| |0|| |0|| |1|| |0|| |0|||0|| |0|| |0|| |1|| |0|| |0
|-
|-
|| 27 || |DF ||align=left| Shane O'Neill || |4|| |0|| |0|| |0|| |0|| |0|| |0|| |0|| |0|| |1|| |0|| |0|| |0|| |0|| |0|||0|| |0|| |0|| |5|| |0|| |0
|-
|-
|| 28 || |DF ||align=left| Yeimar Gómez Andrade || |3|| |0|| |0|| |0|| |0|| |0|| |0|| |0|| |0|| |0|| |0|| |0|| |0|| |0|| |0|||0|| |0|| |0|| |3|| |0|| |0
|-
|-
|| 33 || |DF ||align=left| Joevin Jones || |1|| |0|| |0|| |0|| |0|| |0|| |0|| |0|| |0|| |0|| |0|| |0|| |0|| |0|| |0|||0|| |0|| |0|| |1|| |0|| |0
|-
|-
|| 37 || |MF ||align=left| Shandon Hopeau || |1|| |0|| |0|| |0|| |0|| |0|| |0|| |0|| |0|| |0|| |0|| |0|| |0|| |0|| |0|||0|| |0|| |0|| |1|| |0|| |0
|-
|-
!colspan=3|Total !!31!!0!!0!!0!!0!!0!!0!!0!!0!!5!!0!!0!!4!!0!!0!!0!!0!!0!!40!!0!!0

Honors and awards

MLS Team of the Week

Italics indicates MLS Player of the Week

MLS Goal of the Week

MLS Best XI

Transfers

For transfers in, dates listed are when Sounders FC officially signed the players to the roster. Transactions where only the rights to the players are acquired are not listed. For transfers out, dates listed are when Sounders FC officially removed the players from its roster, not when they signed with another club. If a player later signed with another club, his new club will be noted, but the date listed here remains the one when he was officially removed from Sounders FC roster.

In

Draft picks

Draft picks are not automatically signed to the team roster. Only those who are signed to a contract will be listed as transfers in. Only trades involving draft picks and executed after the start of 2020 MLS SuperDraft will be listed in the notes.

Out

Notes
A.  Players who are under contract with Tacoma Defiance.

References

Seattle Sounders FC seasons
Seattle Sounders
Seattle
Seattle
2020 CONCACAF Champions League participants seasons
Seattle Sounders